Tahir Mosque is an Ahmadiyya Muslim mosque located in Payangadi India. It's foundation was laid in July, 1919 by Hadhrat Maulana Gulam Rasool Rajeki sahib.

Facilities
 Prayer halls for men and women
 Offices
 Multi-functional rooms
 Wash-room facilities

See also

 Ahmadiyya Muslim Community
 Islam in India	
 Islamic architecture	
 Islamic art	
 List of mosques

References

Ahmadiyya mosques in India
Mosques in Kerala
Mosques completed in 2008
Religious buildings and structures in Kannur district